Something After All is the third studio album by Brigitte DeMeyer.

Critical reception

Ronnie D. Lankford, Jr. of AllMusic concludes his review with, "Something After All is a finely wrought country-folk album."

No Depression Magazine says: "Producer Brady Blade's thoughtful arrangements, built upon organic and atmospheric elements, provide the perfect setting for DeMeyer's soulful vocals" and ethereal lyricism. The results sound something like Sheryl Crow backed by Emmylou Harris Spyboy band."

Edward F. Nesta  reviews the album for Luxery Experience and writes, "On Something After All she surrounds herself with a Who’s Who of musical talent, but Brigitte does not get lost; this is her release. Brigitte shows her talents having written 8 of the 11 tracks, as well as performing all of the lead vocals; though she is an accomplished guitarist from her solo performance days, she leaves the acoustic and electric guitar playing in the hands of the likes of Joban Carlberg, Chris Rossbach, Joacim Backman and Buddy Miller."

See original reviews for full articles. Links can be found in the references section of this article.

Track listing

Track information verified from the album's liner notes  and checked against AllMusic and Discogs.

Personnel
Vocals – Brigitte DeMeyer
Acoustic Guitar – Chris Rosbach (tracks: 3, 4, 6, 8, 9, 11), Joacim Backman (tracks: 1 to 3, 6 to 10), Johan Carlberg (tracks: 2, 4, 10, 11)
Backing Vocals – Bernard Fowler (tracks: 3, 6, 8, 10, 11), Brigitte DeMeyer (tracks: 3)
Banjo – Emily Saliers (tracks: 2)
Baritone Guitar – Chris Rosbach (tracks: 7)
Bass – Darryl Jones (tracks: 2 to 10)
Drums – Brady Blade (tracks: 2, 4 to 11)
Electric Guitar – Buddy Miller (tracks: 7), Chris Rosbach (tracks: 5), Daniel Lanois (tracks: 10), Joacim Backman (tracks: 2, 10, 11), Johan Carlberg (tracks: 2, 6, 7, 9 to 11)
Electric Guitar [Fender Strat] – Chris Rosbach (tracks: 2)
Electric Guitar [Gretsch] – Joacim Backman (tracks: 4)
Guitar – Joacim Backman (tracks: 5), Johan Carlberg (tracks: 5)
Guitar [Ebow] – Joacim Backman (tracks: 9), Johan Carlberg (tracks: 9)
Guitar [Gretsch] – Johan Carlberg (tracks: 8)
Harmonica – Steve Earle (tracks: 5)
Harmony Vocals – Brady Blade (tracks: 5), Brigitte DeMeyer (tracks: 5), Buddy Miller (tracks: 1), Buddy Miller (tracks: 7), Emily Saliers (tracks: 4)
Organ [B-3] – Jimmy Pugh (tracks: 1, 2, 5, 6, 9, 11)
Organ [Fender Rhodes] – Jimmy Pugh (tracks: 9)
Organ [Hammond] – Jimmy Pugh (tracks: 6)
Organ [Wurlitzer] – Brady Blade (tracks: 6), Jimmy Pugh (tracks: 8, 10), Nic "Ned" Manders (tracks: 1, 3, 6)
Pedal Steel Guitar – Daniel Lanois (tracks: 4, 6)
Percussion – Brady Blade (tracks: 2, 3, 6, 7, 11)
Piano – Jimmy Pugh (tracks: 9), Nic "Ned" Manders (tracks: 4)
Piano [Tack] – Jimmy Pugh (tracks: 7)
Slide Guitar – Johan Carlberg (tracks: 3)
Synthesizer [Taurus Pedals] – Daniel Lanois (tracks: 4)
Producer – Brady Blade
Engineer [Assistant] – Steve Armstrong
Mastered By – Andy VanDette
Programmed By [Strings] – Joacim Backman (tracks: 4)
Recorded By, Mixed By, Engineer – Nic Manders
Programmed By – Joacim Backman (tracks: 1)

Personnel credits adapted from Discogs.

References

External links
Brigitte DeMeyer Official Site

2006 albums
33rd Street Records albums